Haplobainosomatidae is a family of millipedes belonging to the order Chordeumatida. Adult millipedes in this family have 30 segments (counting the collum as the first segment and the telson as the last).

Genera:
 Aragosoma Mauries, 1970
 Cantabrosoma Mauriès, 1970
 Galicisoma Mauriès, 2014
 Guadarramasoma Gilgado, Ledesma, Enghoff & Mauriès, 2017
 Haplobainosoma Verhoeff, 1899
 Pyreneosoma Mauriès, 1959
 Turdulisoma Mauriès, 1964

References

Chordeumatida